The canton of Villebois-Lavalette is located in the Charente department in southwestern France. It had 7,608 inhabitants (2012). It was disbanded following the French canton reorganisation which came into effect in March 2015. It consisted of 17 communes, which joined the canton of Tude-et-Lavalette in 2015.

The canton comprised the following communes:

Blanzaguet-Saint-Cybard
Charmant
Chavenat
Combiers
Dignac
Édon
Fouquebrune
Gardes-le-Pontaroux
Gurat
Juillaguet
Magnac-Lavalette-Villars
Ronsenac
Rougnac
Sers
Torsac
Vaux-Lavalette
Villebois-Lavalette

References

Villebois-Lavalette
2015 disestablishments in France
States and territories disestablished in 2015